Fritz Nussbaum (1 January 1924 – 11 September 2013) was a Swiss athlete. He competed in the men's decathlon at the 1948 Summer Olympics.

References

External links
 

1924 births
2013 deaths
Athletes (track and field) at the 1948 Summer Olympics
Swiss decathletes
Olympic athletes of Switzerland
People from Uster
Sportspeople from the canton of Zürich